Lycée Français Paul Valéry de Cali (LPFV) is a French international school in Cali, Colombia. It serves preschool levels, through to the final year of senior high school, terminale.

The school was founded in october 1956 to bring french education to the city. It had a number of venues until it moved to a permanent location in 1967 to La Flora, a neighborhood at the north of the city . 

Under the directorship of headmaster Slavomir Draschler  the school graduated its first class in 1970.

In 2022 the school moved to a new countryside venue in Arroyohondo (Yumbo) .

Notable alumni
Catalina García, lead vocalist of Monsieur Periné
Valentina Acosta, Colombian actress
Mara Viveros Vigoya
Georges Bougaud, a French-Colombian entrepreuneur

References

External links
 Lycee Français Paul Valéry de Cali

Schools in Cali
Cali